This is a list of past and present rolling stock used on the Vale of Rheidol Railway, a  narrow gauge heritage railway, opened in 1902, that runs for  between Aberystwyth and Devil's Bridge in the county of Ceredigion, Wales.

The railway was later operated by the Cambrian Railways, Great Western Railway and British Rail  before being 'privatised' in 1989 and run as a heritage railway operation (though arguably it had operated as a tourist railway operation since the mid-1930s, when the GWR withdrew freight services and winter passenger services, rendering the railway wholly reliant on the tourist trade).

When first opened, the railway owned two steam locomotives, No 1 Edward VII and No 2 Prince of Wales, along with a third contractor's locomotive No 3 Rheidol. In 1922 the Great Western Railway took over the running of the line and over the next two decades invested heavily in new locomotives and replacement rolling stock.

Locomotives

Steam locomotives

The railway has four steam locomotives for use on passenger trains, three of which were built for the Vale of Rheidol line and have operated on the line ever since. A fourth locomotive arrived in 2017 for use on passenger trains and is not prototypical for the line historically.

The standard livery for the GWR engines is Great Western Railway green and all three of those locomotives currently carry this livery. The locomotives were named by British Railways in 1956 and currently do not carry their nameplates.

It carries its nameplates of "Drakensberg" on its water tank.

Diesel locomotives

The steam locomotive fleet is today supplemented by a diesel locomotive, number 10, built by Baguley-Drewry and brought to the railway by the Brecon Mountain Railway during the time when the VoR was owned by the same company. Although it lacks the power of the steam locomotives, it is available for shunting duties, works trains, and also operating light passenger trains. A second diesel locomotive has been obtained and is under restoration.

Self propelled engineering plant

The railway has a number of vehicles for permanent way maintenance.

Former locomotives

No 1, & No 2 (later 1212 & 1213)
The VoR commenced operations with two  locomotives constructed by Davies & Metcalfe of Manchester, Nos.1 and 2. These locomotives were given Nos.1212 and 1213 by the GWR when it took over the line on grouping. They were Davies and Metcalfe's first locomotives and a Great Central Railway boilersmith, Thomas Kay, provided expertise in their construction. The contract was given to a company previously inexperienced in locomotive building (although previously they were involved in the repair of locomotives and made injectors) because Mr. Metcalfe was an Aberystwyth man. The design draws inspiration from the Manning Wardle s on the then-newly opened Lynton and Barnstaple Railway, to which they bear some resemblance. This may be because the Szlumper family was heavily involved in both railways' design and construction.

No 3 (later 1198)

The GWR numbered it 1198 in 1923, but it was withdrawn and scrapped the following year, having never carried its GWR number.

No 4

In 1902 the railway's Directors temporarily hired a locomotive from the Ffestiniog Railway. The locomotive sent was Ffestiniog No 4 Palmerston. The following year VoR locomotive No 3 Rheidol was acquired (see entry above), but a need for a fourth locomotive was still discerned. Palmerston No 4 was therefore hired again from Ffestiniog, and became the regular fourth locomotive for the next twenty years, being hired for several long periods, interspersed with brief home visits to Ffestiniog. The locomotive carried fleet number '4' in reference to its position on its home railway, although the number also matched its position on the Vale of Rheidol, as the fourth locomotive. When the line was acquired by the Great Western Railway, the leased locomotive was no longer required and was returned to Ffestiniog (from where it was immediately re-hired to the Welsh Highland Railway, to assist with construction). Palmerston (an ) was built in 1864 by George England of New Cross, the fourth of the original four Ffestiniog Railway locomotives and was named after the Prime Minister, Viscount Palmerston. Palmerston returned to the Vale of Rheidol in 2014, hauling a series of special trains during September to celebrate its association with the VoR, and to commemorate both a century of history since the first world war, and 25 years of VoR independent operation.

Visiting locomotives under overhaul

The following locomotives are currently resident at the Vale of Rheidol Railway, either undergoing overhaul in the workshop or stored.

Coaching stock

Current coaching stock

The Vale of Rheidol Railway has a total of 16 carriages and 1 brake van. All were built by the Great Western Railway at Swindon to replace much older rolling stock built by the Midland Railway Carriage and Wagon Company for the opening of the line. Twelve bogie carriages were built for the opening.

All the stock is third class only, unless otherwise stated. All currently carry both their GWR numbers (on carriage sides) and also their VoR numbers (on the carriages ends).

Former coaching stock

Museum collection
The Vale of Rheidol Railway owns an extensive collection of historic narrow gauge locomotives and rolling stock which are and are destined for museum display at a future date.

Museum collection locomotives
At present none of these locomotives are available for public viewing with the exception of Wren 3114 and Quarry Hunslet Margaret.

Museum collection coaching stock

The railway owns a number of historic carriages from other railways. This is destined for museum display in future.

Visiting locomotives

The following locomotives have visited the railway in the past.

References

Bibliography

External links

Vale of Rheidol Railway website

Vale of Rheidol Railway
Locomotives by railway
United Kingdom narrow gauge rolling stock
Preserved narrow gauge steam locomotives of Great Britain
2-6-2T locomotives
Vale of Rheidol Railway rolling stock
Vale Of Rheidol Railway